The 2015 Tour of Qinghai Lake is the 14th edition  of an annual professional road bicycle racing stage race held in Qinghai Province, China since 2002, named after Qinghai Lake. The race is run at the highest category (apart from those races which make up the UCI World Tour, and is rated by the International Cycling Union (UCI) as a 2.HC (hors category) race as part of the UCI Asia Tour.

Stage Winners

References

Tour of Qinghai Lake
2015 UCI Asia Tour
2015 in Chinese sport